The  is a 1.5 km light rail line owned by Iyotetsu. The line runs entirely within the city of Matsuyama, Ehime Prefecture, Japan.

History 
The Matsuyama Electric Railway was merged with Iyotetsu in 1921, who continued to operate the line. The line was briefly closed in 1945 due to damages from air raids in the Second World War, but was restored in 1948.

Operations
The line is electrified and is single-tracked for the entire line. There are no passing loops on the line.

Stations

References

Railway lines in Japan
Rail transport in Ehime Prefecture
Railway lines opened in 1911